Now I'm a Woman is a studio album by Nancy Wilson, released on Capitol Records in July 1970. It marked a transition in Wilson's career towards R&B-oriented material that she would record over the next decade. The production team of Kenny Gamble and Leon Huff, known for developing Philadelphia soul, wrote songs for Wilson and used their staff of arrangers-conductors, including Bobby Martin and Thom Bell, to create a record with "the Philly sound." David Cavanaugh, who had produced all of Wilson's albums since her 1959 debut, served as executive producer on the project.

Jason Elias at AllMusic calls Now I'm a Woman "an important album in Wilson's oeuvre and the Philly sound." He notes that "Wilson falls right into the production style. The title track is a customary strong outing from Kenny Gamble and Leon Huff." He also highlights "the beautiful" Gamble-Huff song "Joe," noting Bell's production and saying, "Wilson gives an amazing performance and a particularly emotional note that might go through a listener."

Reviewing the album in 1970, Billboard praised Wilson as "a talent of consistent fine quality" and said "in this album she demonstrates her versatility and professionalism." Stereo Review had mixed feelings about the album, saying, "She's as good as ever. That is, if you like last year's hits warmed over." But they also praised several songs on the second side. "Let's Fall in Love All Over Again is a wildly gushy old-fashioned love song, and I'm wild about it. Make It with You is my favorite and for me the flirt song of the year."

Now I'm a Woman was a No. 5 hit on Billboards Best Selling Soul LPs, and remained on the chart for 23 weeks, while the title track reached No. 41 on Best Selling Soul Singles. The album entered the Billboard 200 on November 28, 1970, eventually peaking at No. 54.

In 2013, SoulMusic Records released a digitally remastered version of the album, paired with Can't Take My Eyes Off You, another Wilson album from 1970. The compact disc contains three bonus tracks.

Track listing

Side 1 

 "Now I'm a Woman" (Kenny Gamble, Leon Huff) - 2:50
 "Joe" (Allan Felder, Kenny Gamble, Norman Harris) - 2:23
 "(They Long to Be) Close to You" (Burt Bacharach, Hal David) - 3:30
 "The Long and Winding Road" (John Lennon, Paul McCartney) - 2:28
 "Bridge over Troubled Water" (Paul Simon) - 5:00

Side 2 

 "Let's Fall in Love All Over" (Bobby Martin) - 3:12
 "Lonely, Lonely" (Gamble, Huff) - 2:58
 "How Many Broken Wings" (Helen Lewis, Kay Lewis) - 3:13
 "The Real Me" (Gamble, Huff) - 2:50
 "Make It with You" (David Gates) - 3:01

Personnel 

 Nancy Wilson - vocals
 Bobby Martin - arranger, conductor
 Thom Bell - arranger
 Lenny Pakula - arranger
 David Cavanaugh - executive producer
 Jay Ranellucci - engineer

References 

1970 albums
Nancy Wilson (jazz singer) albums